State Route 298 (SR 298) is a short northwest-southeast state highway located in the east-central part of the U.S. state of Georgia. The route travels from SR 46 east of Soperton to SR 297 north of Vidalia.

Route description
It heads southeast, and, almost immediately, has an intersection with Treutlen County Road 47 (John Phillips Road). Farther southeast is an intersection with Treutlen County Road 54. Southeast of that point, SR 298 intersects Treutlen County Road 204 and passes Price Pond. Just past Price Pond is an intersection with Treutlen County Road 53. A little while later are intersections with Treutlen County Road 51 (Naked Creek Road) and Treutlen County Road 48 in rapid succession. Just before crossing into Montgomery County, SR 298 intersects Treutlen County Road 49. In Montgomery County is an intersection with Montgomery County Road 006 (J.L. Coleman Road).

SR 298 runs its entire length through rural portions of Treutlen, Montgomery, and Toombs counties, and as a result, sees an Annual Average Daily Traffic (AADT) of less than 2,000 vehicles. The route mainly serves mainly local traffic.

History

Major intersections

See also

References

External links

298
Transportation in Treutlen County, Georgia
Transportation in Montgomery County, Georgia
Transportation in Toombs County, Georgia